Dibyendu Sarkar is an Indian biochemist, molecular microbiologist and a Chief Scientist at the Institute of Microbial Technology. He is known for his studies on Mycobacterium tuberculosis (Mtb), the bacterial pathogen causing the disease of tuberculosis. His studies have been documented by way of a number of articles and Google Scholar, an online repository of scientific articles has listed 23 of them. He has also delivered invited speeches which included the Second Annual Meeting on Infectious Diseases held at the Indian Institute of Science in September 2017. He is an elected member of Guha Research Conference and a recipient of the Raman Research Fellowship of the Council of Scientific and Industrial Research. The Department of Biotechnology of the Government of India awarded him the National Bioscience Award for Career Development, one of the highest Indian science awards, for his contributions to biosciences, in 2011.

Selected bibliography

See also 

 Transcriptional regulation
 Erythropoietin

Notes

References 

N-BIOS Prize recipients
Indian scientific authors
Living people
Scientists from Chandigarh
Indian medical researchers
Scientists from Delhi
Year of birth missing (living people)
Indian molecular biologists
Indian microbiologists
Indian biochemists